The following lists events that happened during 1927 in Liberia.

Incumbents
President: Charles D. B. King 
Vice President: Henry Too Wesley
Chief Justice: F. E. R. Johnson

Events

May
 May 3 - A general election and constitutional referendum were held.

References

 
Years of the 20th century in Liberia
Liberia
Liberia